Jane Suzanne Fancher (born 1952) is a science fiction and fantasy author and artist.

Work
In the early 1980s, she worked for Warp Graphics as an art assistant on Elfquest, providing inking assistance on the black and white comics and coloring on Books 2 and 3 of the original graphic novel reprints. Reprint editions omitted her name from the art credits, and later graphic novel editions used different coloring.

She adapted portions of C. J. Cherryh's Gate of Ivrel, the first novel in Cherryh's Morgaine series. Gate of Ivrel: No. 1 (1985) was a self-published black and white comic book that lasted one issue. Fancher expanded the material in color intending a series of graphic novels: Gate of Ivrel: Claiming Rites (1986) and Gate of Ivrel: Fever Dreams (1987). The adaptations were done in collaboration with Cherryh. She did not complete the series, but the experience led to Fancher becoming a prose author herself, as well as frequent professional collaboration and marriage with Cherryh.

Fancher's books include the "Groundties" series, as well as the "Dance of the Rings" trilogy: Ring of Lightning (1995); Ring of Intrigue (1997), and Ring of Destiny (1999).

The "Groundties" trilogy (Groundties, Uplink, Harmonies of the 'Net) was published in e-book form in 2011. There is also a prequel, titled the 'NetWalkers.

Fancher, Cherryh and author Lynn Abbey run an online publishing house, Closed Circle, to market their own work.

Personal life

Fancher was born in Renton, Washington on October 24, 1952.

She has virtual degrees in Physics and Anthropology from Washington State University and training in computer programming, psychology, philosophy, and history.

Fancher currently lives in Spokane, Washington with her 'spousal unit', science fiction writer C. J. Cherryh (Carolyn Janice Cherry), after living with her for years in a domestic partnership.  The couple were married on May 17, 2014.

Bibliography

Illustrated adaptations with C. J. Cherryh
Gate of Ivrel: Fever Dreams (April 1989)   
Gate of Ivrel: Claiming Rites (April 1989)   

Illustration
Elfquest Book 2 by Wendy and Richard Pini (June 1982) 

As J.S. Fancher
GroundTies (October 1991)   
Uplink (March 1992)    
Harmonies of the 'Net (October 1992)   

As Jane S. Fancher
Dance of The Rings series
Ring of Lightning (June 1995)   
Ring of Intrigue (January 1997)   
Ring of Destiny (December 1999)   

As J. Fancher
Blood Red Moon: Nights of the Blood Red Moon Vol 1 (April 2011)   

Ebooks only
Rings of Change: Allizant  
Nights of the Blood Red Moon Flux: A BRM Short Story A Tale from the Alexander Years (2011)   
Netwalkers: Part I Partners  
'''Netwalkers: Part II Of Mentors and Mimetrons  Netwalkers: Omnibus (prequel to GroundTies), containing Partners and Of Mentors and Mimetrons  
'''Netwalkers: Book II Wild Cards  
'Netwalkers: Book III NeXus  

with C. J. Cherryh
Chernevog (revised ebook edition) (2012)
Alliance Rising (2019) – Prometheus Award winner 2020

References

External links
Official website
Interview at SFFWorld.com

1952 births
20th-century American novelists
American fantasy writers
American LGBT novelists
American science fiction writers
American women short story writers
American women novelists
American LGBT writers
LGBT people from Washington (state)
Writers from Spokane, Washington
Living people
Women science fiction and fantasy writers
20th-century American women writers
20th-century American short story writers
Novelists from Washington (state)
21st-century American women